Halfeli (previously in Armenian: Վանքատեղ, romanized: Vank’ategh,) is a belde (town) in the central district (Iğdır) of Iğdır Province, Turkey.

The towns economy relies on agriculture. Due to a climate milder than most other Eastern Anatolian towns, it has a variety of crops including cotton. Another revenue of the town is livestock trading.

In the local elections of March 2019, Hasan Safa from the Peoples' Democratic Party (HDP) was elected mayor. However, in March 2020 Safa was dismissed from his post due to alleged links to terrorism. Due to regulations introduced in September 2016, mayors suspended by terror related charges are not to be replaced by someone elected by the municipal council. Lütfullah Göktaş, the Kaymakam from Karakoyunlu was appointed as a trustee instead.

History 
The settlement was founded by the Halfeli tribe of Kurds during the Ottoman Empire. However, after the Russian Empire annexed the province in the Treaty of Turkmenchay, the tribe emigrated south to Iran.

Under the Russian Empire, Halfeli was placed under the territorial-administrative jurisdiction of the Surmalin Uyezd of the Erivan Governorate. The town was settled by Armenians and known as Vank'ategh (Monastery Place).

Following the First World War, the town was briefly part of the First Republic of Armenia between 1918-1920 until the conclusion of the Turkish–Armenian War. Following the expulsion of the town's Armenian inhabitants, the Halfeli Kurd tribe returned.

On June 18, 1992, the town area was granted the status of municipality.

In 1994, the settlement was declared a seat of a township.

Population 
The population of Halfeli was reported 8,455 as of 2021.

References

Populated places in Iğdır Province
Towns in Turkey
Iğdır Central District
Kurdish settlements in Turkey
Former Armenian inhabited settlements